Derek Morgan is a fictional character on the CBS crime drama Criminal Minds, portrayed by Emmy Award winner Shemar Moore. Morgan specializes in fixations and obsessive behaviors. He is a Supervisory Special Agent of the FBI's Behavioral Analysis Unit, briefly serving as interim unit chief. He first appeared in the series' pilot episode, "Extreme Aggressor", which was originally broadcast on September 22, 2005. Before he left in season 11, he was one of only three main characters to appear since the first season as "starring" while also becoming the only character to appear in all episodes.

Background 
Morgan and his sisters Sarah and Desirée grew up on the South Side, Chicago, in a crime-ridden neighborhood. He is the son of an African American father and a white mother. He rarely speaks of his immediate family, but he is close to his mother and sisters and returns every year for his mother Fran's birthday. In season 2 it was stated that he was around age 33, putting his birth year around 1973; this is retconned in season 11, wherein the passing of Derek's father is stated to have happened on November 7, 1985, and Derek was stated to have been 10 years old at that time, putting his birth date closer to 1975. Another explanation for this seeming discrepancy would be if his birthday was in late November or December, meaning he would've turned 11 soon after his father's death, making his birth year 1974, also allowing him to be 33 in season 2. He attended Northwestern University on a football scholarship, graduating summa cum laude. Although it was stated that he had graduated from law school, there has never been any mention of him practicing law. He was the star quarterback until a left knee injury ended his career.

At the age of 10, Morgan was a witness to the shooting death of his father, who was a police officer. Left without a father figure, he had behavioral problems as an adolescent and earned himself a juvenile record for fighting. He was taken under the wing of a local youth center coordinator, Carl Buford (Julius Tennon). Buford acted as a surrogate father to Morgan, helping expunge Morgan's juvenile criminal record and him to obtain the aforementioned football scholarship. However, Buford also sexually abused him, a fact which Morgan only admitted years later, under extreme duress. As a teen he discovered the body of an unidentified boy, which had a profound effect on him (he went door to door in order to collect money to buy the boy a headstone and visited the boy's grave every time he came home to Chicago). Due to his difficult past, he has no sympathy for criminals who attempt to use their traumatic childhoods as an excuse for their crimes. Prior to joining the FBI, Morgan was a Chicago Police Department officer and served in their bomb squad. At one time he spent 18 months doing deep undercover work.

Years later, Morgan's past comes back to haunt him when he is arrested by the Chicago Police Department for the murder of the unidentified boy and two others. The lead detective, who had arrested Morgan several times for juvenile misdemeanors when the latter was young, believes Morgan is guilty and uses a BAU profile created by team leader Jason Gideon (Mandy Patinkin) to support his case. Believing Morgan is being framed by the real killer, the BAU searches through his life and background to prove him innocent. They later identify Carl Buford as the man who set Morgan up to take the fall (Buford was friends with the lead detective). Morgan then escapes police custody and speaks to a local boy who was friends with the latest victim. The boy reveals that Buford molested him, and that the latest victim knew about it. Morgan confronts Buford, who at first denies that anything happened between them, and tells Morgan the other boy is lying. Morgan eventually gets Buford to admit to the abuse, which is overheard by Chicago PD detectives lying in wait nearby, who arrest Buford. Buford pleads with Morgan to help him, to which Morgan replies, "You go to Hell."

Characterization 
Characterized as a "jock", Morgan is the most athletic of the BAU team members, often being tasked with the more physical aspects of the job, such as taking down intimidating suspects or chasing a runaway on foot. He holds a black belt in judo and has occasionally been asked to train other FBI agents for fitness tests and in SWAT tactics. Due to his past as a juvenile delinquent and experience with gangsters in Chicago, he is rarely intimidated by suspects, even those belonging to criminal syndicates.

Morgan often appears to be happy-go-lucky and is frequently seen teasing or playing pranks on colleagues Penelope Garcia (Kirsten Vangsness) and Spencer Reid (Matthew Gray Gubler). As his background is revealed, it becomes apparent that Morgan is putting on a facade to bury the painful memories of his past. He looks up to Supervisory Special Agent Aaron Hotchner (Thomas Gibson) and senior agent David Rossi (Joe Mantegna), Gideon's successor, as mentors. They are usually the ones to calm Morgan down when a case gets to him. Hotchner at one point says of Morgan, "There are very few people he truly trusts", but Morgan is extremely loyal to those "few" (the BAU team).

Morgan bears an especially intense grudge against serial killer George Foyet (C. Thomas Howell). In season 5, Foyet attacks Morgan, steals his FBI credentials, and nearly kills Hotchner. Morgan temporarily takes over Hotchner's position as Unit Chief while Foyet is on the loose on the condition that Hotchner be reinstated once Foyet is captured.

Morgan is good with children, which becomes apparent when the team is assigned to cases involving minors. Morgan is frequently tasked with interviewing children or adolescents, especially boys, for information.

Behavioral Analysis Unit

Morgan is at one point a candidate to replace SSA Kate Joyner (Sienna Guillory) as Unit Chief of the New York FBI field office. Hotchner does not recommend him for the position, however, due to concerns that Morgan does not have enough trust in his coworkers. However, after Joyner is killed by an IED in the fourth-season premiere, Hotchner tells Morgan that the job is his if he wants it. Nevertheless, Morgan chooses not to take the position, and remains with the BAU.

Because of his experiences as a teenager, Morgan seems to bear a lingering hostility towards organized religion, but he still prays, even going so far as to visit a church. He is very charming, and has been seen flirting with many women, even dancing with several at a time in a bar. In one episode, Morgan asks out Jordan Todd (Meta Golding), only later realizing that she is about to be his coworker. However, as with most BAU agents, a long-term stable romantic relationship has eluded him, until Season 11, where he announces his engagement to his girlfriend, Savannah Hayes (Rochelle Aytes). They eventually have a son named Hank Spencer Morgan, naming him after Derek's father and Reid.

Morgan is intensely devoted to his coworkers, especially Technical Analyst Penelope Garcia. Morgan often calls her "baby girl", "doll face" or "sweetness"—having first used the term when he did not know her name, he continued doing so when she seemed to like it. In the aftermath of Joyner's death, Morgan tells Garcia that she is his "God-given solace" after jumping out of an ambulance which was about to blow up. Morgan's close relationship with Garcia is made especially clear after she is shot by a serial killer the team is investigating; while taking her home from the hospital, Morgan tells Garcia, "I love you, you know that, right?". He then insists on staying with her to protect her, eventually saving her life.

Morgan has a close friendship with SSA Dr. Spencer Reid, akin to that of a protective older brother figure. Morgan frequently exchanges friendly banter with Reid, and attempts to help him with his love life. In the episode "Revelations," he is particularly distressed after he witnesses Reid's torture live while Reid is held prisoner by serial killer Tobias Hankel (James Van Der Beek); he even goes as far as stating that he would like to put Hankel's "head on a stick" as revenge for hurting Reid. Morgan often calls him "Doc", "Kid", "Genius", or "Pretty Boy" and they frequently tease each other and exchange banter, even going as far as having a "joke war" in the episode "Painless". Morgan also gives Reid advice on how to pick up women at a bar, and he is one of few people who know that Reid is experiencing extremely painful headaches that he fears are signs of schizophrenia.

He also has a close friendship with Agent Emily Prentiss (Paget Brewster). After she joined the team in season 2, they immediately bond due to their mutual love of Kurt Vonnegut novels. In the episode "Valhalla", Morgan tells Prentiss that she can trust him, and that he is there for her no matter what. In Prentiss' final episode as a series regular, 6x18 "Lauren", she disappears after walking out of the BAU to go and confront her nemesis, IRA terrorist Ian Doyle (Timothy V. Murphy). At the end of the episode, after Doyle stabs her in the abdomen, Morgan rushes to her side to try to save her. At the hospital, Jareau tells the team that Prentiss died in surgery, and Morgan is especially devastated; he is unaware that she faked her death in order to enter the Witness Protection Program. In season seven, Morgan is the first to discover that Prentiss is alive. When she returns to the BAU, they share an emotional moment and an embrace. Later, Morgan tells her he was never upset at her, nor does he feel betrayed. In "Dorado Falls", Morgan signs them up for takedown re-certification without telling her and lets her believe Hotchner was responsible. He does not want her to know that he signed her up because he does not want to acknowledge that he needs to make sure she can still take care of herself. Later, he tells her he did it because losing her was "seven months of hell" and he worried that his fear of losing her would be so great it would interfere with his job. She tells him she understands and agrees to 10 hours of training. 

In "Big Sea", Morgan's aunt Yvonne (Denise Dowse) calls him when a number of bodies are found on the ocean floor off of Jacksonville, Florida, fearing that her missing daughter, Cindi (Shanola Hampton), is one of the victims. After Morgan catches the killer, Blake Wells (Karl Makinen), he shows him a picture of Cindi while interrogating him. Wells claims that she cried for Morgan before he cut her throat. Morgan soon realizes that Wells is lying to him, however, and that Cindi is not one of his victims; nevertheless, Morgan tells his aunt that Cindi is dead to give her closure. Cindi turns up, alive, in season seven's "The Company", having been held captive for seven years by Malcolm Ford (Chad L. Coleman), the leader of a sexual slavery ring.

In season 9 love interest Savannah is introduced for Morgan.  Savannah was introduced to the show because Shemar Moore, the actor who portrays Morgan, had requested that his character should get a romantic partner.  While they initially struggle with the demands of having busy demanding careers they appear to make a compromise.

At the beginning of the episode "A Badge and a Gun", Savannah texts Morgan, telling him that they need to talk, but she doesn't offer an explanation, worrying him. By the end of the episode, the two have a conversation on the phone, and Savannah clarifies that she plans to tell him something good. At that moment, he is abducted by a group of men. He tells her to call Hotchner before one of his attackers grabs his cellphone and destroys it.

Six months later, she and Morgan have gotten married. She shows up at his work for a surprise party; however, this celebration is cut short as the BAU have received a new case. She is mentioned near the end of the episode by Morgan, who states that the two of them are attending a Lamaze class in preparation for their upcoming child. At the end of the episode, Morgan goes to pick her up from Bethesda General Hospital, and they discuss who the child's godparents should be. A sniper is then seen aiming between her and Morgan, and as a gunshot is fired, she cries out Morgan's name. it is revealed that Savannah was shot and she is rushed to the hospital by Morgan to be given medical treatment. During the investigation, it is revealed that Chazz Montolo shot Savannah and was the one who hired Morgan's abductors, having hoped to avenge his son Giuseppe, who was arrested by Morgan and later killed in front of him. Savannah survives the surgery and goes into labor. After the conclusion of the case, Savannah gives birth to a baby boy, who they name Hank Spencer Morgan. She is last seen resting in a hospital bed with Morgan by her side.

As the team celebrates with Morgan, he talks with Hotchner about his departure from the team in order to protect his family and to be around for his son. Morgan says goodbye to Jareau, Reid, and Garcia. Before he leaves the building, he looks into the conference room and watches his team work one last time.

Reception

Morgan was included in TV Guides list of "TV's Sexiest Crime Fighters".

References

Episode sources

External links

Morgan, Derek
Morgan, Derek
Morgan, Derek
Morgan, Derek
Morgan, Derek
Morgan, Derek
Fictional judoka
American male characters in television
Fictional victims of child sexual abuse